Government Engineering College Karwar is an Engineering college in Majali, Karwar, Uttara Kannada district of  Karnataka, India. Situated 6 mile away from Karwar. The college is affiliated to Visvesvaraya Technological University, Belgaum. It is also approved by All India Council for Technical Education AICTE, New Delhi.

About 

Established in 2009. The  aim of the college is to provide good technical education to rural area students.

The institution provides computer-based learning programs to meet the current needs of industry and business.

Courses 

Following are the courses in the college:
 Civil Engineering
 Computer Science & Engg.
 Electronics & Comm. Engg.
 Mechanical Engineering

See also 
Government Engineering College Raichur

References 

Engineering colleges in Karnataka
Karwar
Universities and colleges in Uttara Kannada district